Cup of Gold: A Life of Sir Henry Morgan, Buccaneer, with Occasional Reference to History (1929) was John Steinbeck's first novel, a work of historical fiction based loosely on the life and death of 17th-century privateer Henry Morgan. It centres on Morgan's assault and sacking of Panama City (the "Cup of Gold"), and the woman (La Santa Roja, or the Red Saint) he seeks there, reputed to be fairer than the sun.

Plot 

The novel begins with young Henry on a Welsh farm, listening to Dafydd, an old farm hand who became a pirate and returned to tell of his adventures. The old farm hand tells Old Robert (with Henry listening) his colorful tales of the Caribbean, then leaves by morning. Those stories encourage Henry to leave home to seek his fortune. Henry becomes a famous pirate captain with two goals: to capture Panama from the Spanish, and to win the heart of the Red Saint (La Santa Roja). When Morgan captures Panama, the Red Saint is waiting inside the city. The city is easily taken, but the Red Saint puts up a fight. After Morgan and his crew raid the city, they leave with riches and no Red Saint. Morgan ends his career as a pirate and is knighted by the English King, who places Morgan in charge of disciplining other pirates.

Release details
1929, Robert McBride & Co. (First edition) 1537 copies sold, yellow cloth binding
1936, Covici-Friede (Second edition) Maroon cloth binding (939 copies)
1938, Viking Press
1976, Penguin Books
2008, Penguin Books, introduction by Susan F. Beegel, pp

References

External links
 

1929 American novels
American historical novels
Novels by John Steinbeck
Novels set in the Caribbean
Novels set in Panama
Novels about pirates
Novels set in the 17th century
Cultural depictions of Henry Morgan
1929 debut novels